Day-O is a 1992 American made-for-television fantasy-comedy film about an imaginary childhood friend, "Dayo", played by Elijah Wood, of a woman played by Delta Burke. The film aired on NBC as a presentation of Disney Night at the Movies on May 3, 1992.

Plot
The return of an imaginary childhood friend, Dayo, helps a woman named Grace Connors through various crises, Grace struggles against her timidity to save her grandfather's restaurant. The arrival of her imaginary childhood friend spurs her on to success.

Cast
 Delta Burke as Grace Connors
 Ashley Peldon as Grace (age 4)
 Elijah Wood as Dayo
 Carlin Glynn as Margaret DeGeorgio
 Charles Shaughnessy as Ben Connors
 David Packer as Tony DeGeorgio
 Fred Dalton Thompson as Frank DeGeorgio
 Caroline Dollar as Cory Connors
 Bekka Eaton as Judith
 Richard K. Olsen as Papa Louie
 Michael Hunter as Man at the Park

Reception

Carole Kucharewicz of Variety magazine wrote: "Acharming, well-done telepic revolving around a frazzled Delta Burke, "Dayo" is full of Disney "magic" and above-average performances. Telefilm is enjoyable for adults who want some escape from "60 Minutes," but it's doubtful if children will glean much from the well-written script."

References

External links
 

1992 television films
1992 films
1990s fantasy comedy films
American fantasy comedy films
NBC network original films
Disney television films
Films directed by Michael Schultz
Films scored by Lee Holdridge
Films shot in North Carolina
1990s English-language films
1990s American films